Cylindrocorporidae is a family of nematodes belonging to the order Diplogasterida.

Genera

Genera:
 Cylindrocorpus
 Goodeyus
 Longibucca

References

Nematodes